This list of fossil arthropods described in 2013 is a list of new taxa of trilobites, fossil insects, crustaceans, arachnids and other fossil arthropods of every kind that have been described during the year 2013. The list only includes taxa at the level of genus or species.

Arachnids

Crustaceans

Insects

Blattaria

Coleoptera

Diptera

Ephemeroptera

Hemiptera

Hymenoptera

Lepidoptera

Mecoptera

Miomoptera

Neuroptera

Notoptera

Odonatoptera

Orthoptera

Plecoptera

Trichoptera

Other

Trilobites

Others

References

Arthropod paleontology
Lists of arthropods
2010s in paleontology
Paleontology
2013 in paleontology